Constituency PK-52 (Haripur-IV) was a constituency for the Khyber Pakhtunkhwa Assembly of the Khyber Pakhtunkhwa province of Pakistan.

See also
 Constituency PK-49 (Haripur-I)
 Constituency PK-50 (Haripur-II)
 Constituency PK-51 (Haripur-III)
 Constituency WR-14
 Constituency WR-18

References

External links 
 Khyber Pakhtunkhwa Assembly's official website
 Election Commission of Pakistan's official website
 Awaztoday.com Search Result
 Election Commission Pakistan Search Result

Khyber Pakhtunkhwa Assembly constituencies